Pseudocuma longicorne is a marine species of cumacean in the family Pseudocumatidae.

References 

Cumacea
Animals described in 1858